Rossella  is an Italian television series.

The story is set in Genoa late in the nineteenth century. The main character is a beautiful young girl named Rossella from  a very wealthy family  of high social class. In an accident she meets a journalist named Giuliano and falls in love with him at first sight. In spite of her father's attempt to prevent the marriage, Rossella, who has already been forced to marry Walter Jagaer, elopes with Giuliano in order to get married. It makes the father to reject the daughter with the thought that she has rejected him and because in the atmosphere of such family and society, this kind of act considered to be a great disgrace to the family.

External links
 

Italian television series
RAI original programming